Allospondias is a genus of flowering plants belonging to the family Anacardiaceae.

Its native range is Southern China to Malaysian Peninsula.

Species:

Allospondias lakonensis 
Allospondias laxiflora

References

Anacardiaceae
Anacardiaceae genera